Dana Spiotta (born 1966) is an American author. She was a recipient of the Rome Prize in Literature, a Guggenheim Fellowship and a New York Foundation for the Arts Fellowship.

Her novel Stone Arabia (2011) was a National Book Critics Circle Award finalist. Her novel Eat the Document (2006) was a National Book Award finalist and won the Rosenthal Foundation Award from the American Academy of Arts and Letters. Her novel Lightning Field (2001) was a New York Times Notable Book of the year.

In 2021, Spiotta published Wayward, which concerns four women: Sam Raymond, a perimenopausal woman; Ally Raymond, Sam's daughter; Lily, Sam's mother; and Clara Loomis, a fictitious 19th Century suffragette who ran away to the Oneida Community as a young woman.

Biography
Spiotta was born in 1966 in New Jersey. Her father, son of Italian immigrants, worked for Mobil Oil, and his constant moving made Spiotta a perennial "new-kid". Her parents met at Hofstra while acting in play by fellow student Francis Ford Coppola. In 1979, her father began running Coppola's Zoetrope Studios. She attended Crossroads School and went on to Columbia University, but dropped out at the end of her sophomore year. She moved to Seattle and eventually enrolled at Evergreen State College and studied labor history and creative writing.

She teaches in the Syracuse University MFA creative writing program along with George Saunders, Mary Karr. Spiotta lives in the historic John G. Ayling House in Syracuse, New York with her daughter and partner, writer Jonathan Dee.

Works

References

External links

 Syracuse University profile

Living people
1966 births
21st-century American novelists
21st-century American women writers
American women academics
American women novelists
Evergreen State College alumni
Columbia University alumni
Syracuse University faculty
Novelists from New York (state)
Writers from Syracuse, New York
Writers from New Jersey